Lewistown is a small village in South Wales. It developed to service the local coal mines which have all now closed and it has become largely a commuter village for Bridgend and Maesteg.

References 

Villages in Bridgend County Borough